Gerd Buchdahl (12 August 1914 – 17 May 2001) was a German-English philosopher of science.

Life
Buchdahl was born to German-Jewish parents in Mainz; his younger brother, Hans Adolph Buchdahl was a well-known physicist. Both were transported from Britain to Australia as enemy aliens in 1940 on the Dunera.  He became the first lecturer in history and philosophy of science at the University of Cambridge. A founding fellow of Darwin College, he became University Reader in 1966 and was the Tarner Lecturer at Trinity College in 1973, speaking on Science and rational structures.

Buchdahl founded the journal Studies in the History and Philosophy of Science.

He died in Cambridge and was survived by his wife, Nancy, and three sons.

Works
The developing natural sciences were the causal lens through which he viewed and from which he wrote about the consequences on epistemology and the history of metaphysics. His book Metaphysics and the Philosophy of Science. The classical origins: Descartes to Kant (Oxford: Backwell, 1969) detailed interdependencies of philosophy, on one side, and on the other of practical and theoretical natural sciences. It influenced many scholars in their views about (the history of) science and philosophy.

His book Kant and the Dynamics of Reason. Essays on the Structure of Kant's Philosophy (Oxford: Backwell, 1992) shed light upon Kant's critical intellectualism in respect to the then contemporary developments in the sciences, especially for the anglophone world.

Literature 
 Buchdahl, Gerd. Article in Werner Röder/Herbert A. Strauss (edit.): International Biographical Dictionary of Central European Émigrés 1933–1945 (Biographisches Handbuch der deutschsprachigen Emigration nach 1933). Vol. 2, K. G. Saur Verlag, Munich 1983.
 Nick Jardine: Obituary. Gerd Buchdahl (1914–2001): Founding Editor. In: Studies in History and Philosophy of Science 32, 2001, No. 3, .
 Roger S. Woolhouse: Gerd Buchdahl: Biographical and Bibliographical. In: Roger S. Woolhouse (ed.): Metaphysics and Philosophy of Science in the Seventeenth and Eighteenth Centuries. Essays in Honour of Gerd Buchdahl. Kluwer, Dordrecht 1988, pp. 1–7.
 Ulrich Charpa, 'The Cambridge 'Real Gymnasium' and the 'Freie Schule' London – Historical and Philosophical Remarks on Gerd Buchdahl and Karl R. Popper' Leo Baeck Institute Year Book 56 (2011): 269–287

References

External links 
 Gerd Buchdahl Collection at the Whipple Museum of the History of Science Library

Philosophers of science
Fellows of Darwin College, Cambridge
1914 births
2001 deaths
German emigrants to England
Writers from Mainz
German male writers
Jewish emigrants from Nazi Germany to the United Kingdom
Prisoners and detainees of the United Kingdom
20th-century German philosophers